Treguaco, also spelled as Trehuaco, is a Chilean city and commune in  Itata Province, Ñuble Region.

Demographics
According to data from the 2002 Census of Population and Housing, the Treguaco commune had 5,296 inhabitants; of these, 1,245 (23.5%) lived in urban areas and 4,051 (76.5%) in rural areas. At that time, there were 2,788 men and 2,508 women residing in the commune. The commune's population fell by 6% (341 persons) between the censuses of 1992 and 2002 (0.6% annual loss). Trehuaquino is the demonym for a man from Treguaco, and Trehuaquina is a woman from Treguaco.

Administration
As a commune, Treguaco is a third-level administrative division of Chile administered by a municipal council, headed by an alcalde who is directly elected every four years. For the years 2008-2012, the alcalde is Luis Cuevas Iarra (Ind.), and the council members are:
 Juan Cabrera Monsalve (PH)
 Olga Osses Klein (UDI)
 Gabriel Figueroa Retamal (PDC)
 Jaime Torres Barra (PDC)
 Juan Carlos Sepúlveda Pedreros (PPD)
 Tamara Valenzuela Fuentealba (PS)

Within the electoral divisions of Chile, Treguaco is represented in the Chamber of Deputies as a part of the 42nd electoral district (together with San Fabián, Ñiquén, San Carlos, San Nicolás, Ninhue, Quirihue, Cobquecura, Portezuelo, Coelemu, Ránquil, Quillón, Bulnes, Cabrero and Yumbel). The commune is represented in the Senate as part of the 13th senatorial constituency (Biobío Cordillera).

References

External links
  Municipality of Treguaco

Communes of Chile
Populated places in Itata Province
1973 establishments in Chile